Three Cedars Solar Project is a 210 MWAC (265 MWp) photovoltaic power station consisting of three units extending about 15 miles northwest of Cedar City, Utah.  The project was developed by SunEdison, built with its global team of partners, and commissioned in September 2016.  The electricity and renewable energy credits are being sold to Rocky Mountain Power under three separate 20-year power purchase agreements.

Project details

The project consists of three separate units distributed on private land along the headwaters of Iron Springs Creek at a sunny and cool elevation near 6,000 feet.

Planning was initiated by the independent renewable energy developer First Wind (founded 2002) which began expanding into photovoltaic energy around 2012.   First Wind and its extensive portfolio of assets in western Utah were acquired by SunEdison  and its TerraForm Power yield co in November 2014.  Beginning construction at the time was the 20.2 MW Seven Sisters Project, a dispersed set of ~3 MW facilities throughout Beaver and Iron counties.

To finance the construction of Three Cedars,  SunEdison entered into a joint venture with Dominion Resources.  The resulting entity, Dominion Renewable Energy, utilized $80 million from SunEdison and $320 million from Dominion to start construction in September 2015.  The two companies also previously entered a joint venture to construct the 320 MW Four Brothers Project,  which  includes the three co-located 80 MW Escalante units in Beaver County and the 80 MW Enterprise unit in Iron County, on about the same timeline.

Construction of Three Cedars progressed simultaneously at all three sites, created an estimated 250 local construction jobs, and was completed by October 2016.  Along with the electricity to power more than 36,000 homes, it is expected to produce $17 million in property and income taxes for the region over 20 years.   The project is operated and maintained by Swinerton Renewable Energy.

SunEdison filed for Chapter 11 bankruptcy protection on April 21, 2016, but was able to complete the project on time with its receipt of $300 million in bankruptcy debt financing.  On September 13, 2016 the company was forced to sell its stake in the completed facilities in a fire sale.  NRG Energy was the successful bidder.

Electricity production

See also 

 Solar power in Utah
 List of power stations in Utah

References

Photovoltaic power stations in the United States
Solar power stations in Utah
Buildings and structures in Iron County, Utah
Energy infrastructure completed in 2016